M6 is a planned metro line of the Bucharest Metro. The M6 Line will connect Bucharest North railway station (Gara de Nord) to Henri Coandă International Airport (Aeroport Otopeni). The line is expected to be completed by 2025–2030. As of 2019, only the section from 1 Mai to Tokyo has secured funding. The second section from Tokyo to the airport will be rendered separately at a later date.

Cost
The construction of the new line is estimated to cost around €1.2 billion. The Japan Bank for International Cooperation is financing the project with €300 million.

Stations
M6 Line will have a total of 12 stations: 1 station shared with the existing M4 Line and 11 planned new stations: Pajura, Expoziţiei, Piaţa Montreal, Gara Băneasa, Aeroport Băneasa, Tokyo, Washington, Paris, Bruxelles, Otopeni, Ion I.C. Brătianu, and Aeroport Otopeni.

References

Bucharest Metro Lines
Proposed rail infrastructure in Romania